RTT may refer to:

Computing
 Real-time text, text transmitted as it is generated
 Render to Texture, in computer graphics
 Round-trip time, in telecommunications

Organisations
 Realtime Trains, a UK train tracking website and app
 Recapture Tactics Team, in US Marine Corps
 Régie des Télegraphes et Téléphones, former name of the Belgium telecom company Proximus Group
 Radio and Television of Montenegro (RTCG), formerly Radio-Televizija Titograd (RTT)

Other uses
 Race to the Top, in US education 
 Real-time tactics, genre of strategy games
 Rett syndrome, a neurological disorder
 River Trade Terminal, a Hong Kong container terminal
 Télévision Tunisienne 1, formerly called RTT

See also
 1xRTT, a mobile communications protocol